Thorny Flat is the second highest peak in the U.S. state of West Virginia, after Spruce Knob. Thorny Flat is the high point of the ridge known as Cheat Mountain.

References

Mountains of Pocahontas County, West Virginia
Mountains of West Virginia
Monongahela National Forest